Inches from the Mainline is the debut studio album by Slaves on Dope, released on February 3, 2000.

The album was released by Divine Recordings, with major label distribution in EMI's Priority Records. The album went on to sell approximately 75,000 copies in the US.

Track listing
 "Brotherly Love" – :05
 "Pushing Me" – 3:21
 "I Can't Die" – 3:40
 "Fallout" – 3:46
 "Thanks for Nothing" – 3:55
 "Inches from the Mainline" – 4:08
 "No More Faith" – 3:07
 "Stick It Up" – 3:17
 "Why" – 3:12
 "Bitch Slap" – 4:30
 "Kafka Bug" – 3:55
 "Leader of Losers" – 4:45

Personnel
 Thom Panunzio - Producer, engineer, mixing
 German Villacorta - Engineer, assistant engineer

References

2001 debut albums
Slaves on Dope albums
Priority Records albums
Albums produced by Thom Panunzio